KAKZ-LD, virtual and VHF digital channel 4, is a low-powered independent television station   serving Palm Springs, California, United States that is licensed to Cathedral City. Owned by Tara Broadcasting, the station broadcasts its signal from a transmitter on Edom Hill northeast of Cathedral City.

History

On October 14, 2011, the station's call letters were changed from K04RO-D to KAKZ-LD. In September 2012, Tara Broadcasting, LLC purchased the station from Woodwest Investment, LLC for $85,000. In August 2020, Broadcast Technical Associates, LLC filed with the Federal Communications Commission (FCC) to purchase KAKZ-LD from Tara Broadcasting for $125,000.

Subchannels
The station's digital signal is multiplexed:

References

External links

AKZ-LD
Cathedral City, California
Low-power television stations in the United States